Barbara Balzerani (born 16 January 1949) is an Italian terrorist.

Early life
Balzerani was born at Colleferro, in the province of Rome.

Career
In the 1970s Balzerani became a leader of the Red Brigades (Italian Brigate Rosse, or BR, which she had joined in 1975) in Rome. She took part in several killings, such as that of Girolamo Minervini and the assassination of Aldo Moro's escort in Via Fani (1978). After the arrest of BR's national leader Mario Moretti in 1981, she  unsuccessfully tried to handle the split in the organization, becoming a leader of the "Brigate Rosse - Partito Comunista Combattente", while Giovanni Senzani led the other faction, the "BR - Partito Guerriglia".

During the detention of Aldo Moro, she occupied, together with Moretti, the BR base in Via Gradoli in Rome. The base was discovered due to a water leak, allegedly caused by a tap left open - although the circumstance of its discovery by Italian police forces were never totally made clear. In 1981 she participated in the abduction of US general James L. Dozier.

She was one of the last historical BR leaders to be arrested, in 1985. From prison, she claimed responsibility for the assassination of Florence's former mayor Lando Conti. She was sentenced to life imprisonment, but was paroled on 12 December 2006. She received complete freedom in 2011.

Balzerani has written four books, Compagna luna (1998), La sirena delle cinque (2003),  Perché io, perché non tu (2009) B and Cronaca di un'attesa (2011).

References

External links
Biography at brigaterosse.org website 
Page at Corriere della Sera  archive 

1949 births
Living people
People from Colleferro
Red Brigades
Italian prisoners sentenced to life imprisonment